Harwich railway station may refer to:
 Harwich International railway station, in Parkeston, Essex, United Kingdom
 Harwich Town railway station, in Harwich, Essex, United Kingdom
 Harwich station (Massachusetts), in Harwich, Massachusetts